The 1221 Brickell Building is a high-rise tower in downtown Miami, Florida. It is located in the Brickell area of Miami's financial district. It is on Brickell Avenue near Southeast 12th Street, three blocks west of Biscayne Bay. The building is known for its all-glass, tiered sides, and was completed in 1986. In 2005, the building lost many glass panels during Hurricane Wilma. It is used entirely for offices and is one of Brickell's financial centers.

References

Office buildings completed in 1986
Skyscraper office buildings in Miami
1986 establishments in Florida